Zhou Yushu (22 August 1933 – 1 April 2021) was a lieutenant general in the People's Liberation Army of China who served as commander of the People's Armed Police from 1990 to 1992.

He was a representative of the 19th National Congress of the Chinese Communist Party. He was an alternate member of the 13th Central Committee of the Chinese Communist Party and a member of the 14th Central Committee of the Chinese Communist Party. He was a member of the 9th National Committee of the Chinese People's Political Consultative Conference.

Biography
Zhou was born in You County, Hunan, on 22 August 1933. 

He enlisted in the People's Liberation Army (PLA) in September 1953, and joined the Chinese Communist Party (CCP) in September 1956. In 1945 he attended You County No. 1 High School. After graduating from Zhengzhou Fourth Artillery School in 1956, he was assigned to the 72nd Division of the 24th Group Army, where he eventually became commander in 1985. In 1976, he participated in the rescue of the 1976 Tangshan earthquake. In 1990, he was promoted to become commander of the People's Armed Police, a position he held until 1992. He was deputy commander of the Guangzhou Military Region in 1992, and held that office until 1996. During his term in office, he presided over the preparation of People's Liberation Army Hong Kong Garrison.

He was promoted to the rank of major general (shaojiang) in September 1988 and lieutenant general (zhongjiang) in December 1992. 

On 1 April 2021, he died from an illness in Beijing, at the age of 87.

References

1933 births
2021 deaths
People from You County
PLA National Defence University alumni
People's Liberation Army generals from Hunan
People's Republic of China politicians from Hunan
Chinese Communist Party politicians from Hunan
Alternate members of the 13th Central Committee of the Chinese Communist Party
Members of the 14th Central Committee of the Chinese Communist Party
Members of the 9th Chinese People's Political Consultative Conference